Jaan’nisar is a Pakistani television series focuses on the issue of rule of law to the fore by revealing the deep-rooted nexus of politics and police with the help of a responsible media. It was aired on A-Plus TV and ATV. It is directed by Aamir Yousuf and written by Aamir Raza.

It stars Noman Ijaz, Sohail Sameer, Ghana Ali, Zulqarnain Haider, Saba Faisal, Nayyar Ejaz, Firdous Jamal, Zain Afzal, Jibran Shahid, Qazi Zubair, Sadaf Bhatti, Maira Khan, Iftikhar Qaisr, and Javed Babar. It was released on 21 October 2016.

The series identifies the flaws in Pakistan’s criminal justice system and offers practicable remedies. The drama highlights the contributions and sacrifices made by police force in maintaining law and order in the face of serious challenges coming from lack of capacity, meager resources, political pressures, higher expectations and related constraints.

Plot 
Jaan'nisar features Junaid Khan, a young and bright police officer who is gifted with exemplary skills in the line of duty.  Played by the talented Sohail Sameer, Inspector Junaid is a very honest and capable police officer but the police station he is posted in has witnessed huge rise in the number of kidnapping, robberies, thefts, murders, domestic violence, drugs and other heinous crimes. Many crimes are not reported to police. Junaid equips the police station on modern lines and introduces such reforms in police culture that rapidly decrease crime rate in the area. He strengthens forensic investigation to nab the perpetrators of heinous crimes on scientific lines. From laying hands on circumstantial evidence to weighing the related factors and scientifically examining the proofs, Junaid discharges his responsibilities with utmost devotion, zeal, courage and commitment.

It is convincingly shown that with the introduction of forensic investigation transparency in the investigation is achieved and it drastically reduces the rate of serious crimes including robbery, murder, sexual exploitation, dowry issues, smuggling, terrorism and domestic violence.

Junaid resists political pressures not only professionally, but even at the personal level. Asad Khan, his father, is a big landlord and an influential politician. But Junaid refuses to budge to his pressures. Like other politicians, Asad Khan patronizes several groups in the area. Asad wants his son to join politics to strengthen him politically. On Junaid’s refusal, he is not happy with him. And upon Junaid’s joining police, he tries to use him for political purposes but fails. This further widens the gulf between father and son.

The equally potential track is of a crime show host Sara Iftikhar played by the talented Ghana Ali. She is very critical of police initially but when she come to know about the limitations of police department through Inspector Junaid, she supports police and highlights its performance.

Cast 
 Noman Ijaz
 Sohail Sameer
 Ghana Ali
 Zulqarnain Haider
 Saba Faisal
 Nayyar Ejaz
 Firdous Jamal
 Zain Afzal
 Jibran Shahid
 Qazi Zubair
 Sadaf Bhatti
 Maira Khan
 Iftikhar Qaisr
 Javed Babar

References

External links

2016 Pakistani television series debuts
A-Plus TV original programming
Pakistani crime television series